Dorcadion zarcoi is a species of beetle in the family Cerambycidae. It was described by Schramm in 1910. It is known from Spain.

See also 
Dorcadion

Subspecies
 Dorcadion zarcoi turdetanum Lauffer, 1911
 Dorcadion zarcoi zarcoi Schramm, 1910

References

zarcoi
Beetles described in 1910